The Dr Nkosazana Dlamini-Zuma Local Municipality council consists of twenty-nine members elected by mixed-member proportional representation. Fifteen councillors are elected by first-past-the-post voting in fifteen wards, while the remaining fourteen are chosen from party lists so that the total number of party representatives is proportional to the number of votes received.

It was established for the August 2016 local elections by the merging of Ingwe and Kwa Sani local municipalities.

In the election of 3 August 2016 the African National Congress (ANC) won a majority of twenty-three seats on the council. In 2021 it won a reduced majority of sixteen.

Results 
The following table shows the composition of the council after past elections.

August 2016 election

The following table shows the results of the 2016 election.

November 2021 election

The following table shows the results of the 2021 election.

References

Dr Nkosazana Dlamini-Zuma
Elections in KwaZulu-Natal
Harry Gwala District Municipality